Chemical Playschool 10 is an album of old and new unreleased material and a previous version of The Saucers Are Coming from Hallway of the Gods. It was released by The Legendary Pink Dots in 1997.

Track listing

Personnel
Qa'Sepel – vocals, keyboards, drones, effects, tapes
Silverman (Phil Knight) – keyboards
Niels van Hoornblower – horns, flute
Martijn de Kleer – acoustic & electric guitar, bass, drums
Ryan Moore – bass, drums
Edwin von Trippenhof – electric guitar
Frank Verschuuren – sound devices, effects
cEvin Key – drums on Nouveaux Modes Exotiques

References

1997 albums
The Legendary Pink Dots albums